Derek Fortrose Allen  (29 May 1910 – 13 June 1975) was Secretary of the British Academy from 1969 to 1973 and Treasurer of that organisation from 1973 until his death.

Born in Epsom, Surrey, Allen joined the British Museum staff in 1935 as an Assistant Keeper in the Coin Room. Relatively inexperienced in numismatics at first, he soon had to deal with the classification of the Edward I and II coins in the Boyton hoard of 4000 coins, followed by the classification of the Clarke-Thornhill bequest of 12,000 coins. He became acknowledged as the leading authority on Ancient British coins and as one of the leading  authorities on contemporaneous Continental issues. His project on defining the coinage of Henry II was interrupted by the Second World War and was eventually completed in 1947.

Allen joined the British Numismatic Society in 1935 and served as its Secretary from 1938 to 1941 and was  Editor of volumes XXII and XXIII of the Journal. He was elected as president from 1959 to 1963, was awarded the Sanford Saltus medal in 1953 and elected an Honorary Member in 1971. He was afterwards President of the Royal Numismatic Society from 1966 to 1970 and awarded that Society's medal in 1966. 
 
He was elected a Fellow of the British Academy in 1963 and finished his career as Secretary, then Treasurer, of the Academy. After his death in 1975 his widow Winifred Allen established with the Academy in 1976 a prize in his memory - the Derek Allen Prize - to be awarded annually to recognise outstanding published work in Musicology, Celtic Studies and Numismatics.

In the 1930s, he dubbed in Italian the actor Stan Laurel and Paolo Canali dubbed Oliver Hardy.

References 

 "ALLEN, Derek Fortrose", Who Was Who, A & C Black, 1920–2008; online edn, Oxford University Press, December 2007, accessed 30 May 2011

1910 births
1975 deaths
People from Sutton, London
British numismatists
Companions of the Order of the Bath
Fellows of the Society of Antiquaries of London
Fellows of the British Academy
Presidents of the Royal Numismatic Society